Acraga amazonica is a moth of the family Dalceridae. It is found in northern Brazil (Amazon Basin). The habitat consists of tropical moist forests.

The length of the forewings is 11–13 mm. Adults are orange brown, the hindwings slightly paler than the forewings. Adults are on wing in February, from May to September and from November to December.

Etymology
The species name refers to the distribution in the Amazon Basin.

References

Dalceridae
Moths described in 1994